ViVe (Visión Venezuela) is a cultural television network funded by the Venezuelan national government that was inaugurated on November 11, 2003 and whose objective consists of spreading information related to achievements made by Hugo Chávez’s political process and the encouragement of Venezuela's culture.  Recently, the Venezuelan government has been working towards making ViVe’s signal be seen in all of the country, by acquiring new equipment, antennas, and adequate installations.

ViVe maintains its goal of showing the work of independent producers, and keeps self-financed productions aimed at showing the realities of Venezuelan people "From the inside", in form of short documentaries with a bare-bones approach, therefore needing little production skills to show un-edited versions of the facts, showed off by their own characters.

ViVe TV started by the guiding hand of Blanca Eekhout, formerly of Catia TVe (A local communitary channel in the neighborhood of Catia in Caracas) and due to her work at ViVe, Mrs. Eekhout earned some time as the president of the bigger state-owned Venezolana de Television. Her staying there, though, was controversial, starting with the implementation of a newer graphical image which most people disliked, and the mellowing of the once combative line of work. Mrs. Eekhout was retired from charge in early 2006, and ViVe TV remains in the hands of her former helping team.

ViVe's address is:  Av. Panteón, Foro Libertador, Edf. Biblioteca Nacional, AP-4, Altagracia, Caracas.

Television networks in Venezuela
Bolivarian Communication and Information System
Television stations in Venezuela
Publicly funded broadcasters
Spanish-language television stations
Television channels and stations established in 2003